Great Bend USD 428 is a public unified school district headquartered in Great Bend, Kansas, United States.  The district includes the community of Great Bend and nearby rural areas.

History

In 1885 the first high school in Great Bend opened. The Central School facility, a new high school building, was built in 1908. The 1885 building was razed prior to 1908, and then a junior high school was built on that site in 1912. There was an east building at the Central School built in 1912. Around 1912 the community decided that a replacement high school needed to be built, along with two elementary schools. Another high school opened in 1925. In 1949 the community voted to build a new high school. The 1908 building, together with a library built in 1908, was collectively renamed Central School in 1952, and it was made a sixth grade center. Central School was razed circa 1969.

Schools
The school district operates the following schools:
 Great Bend High School
 Great Bend Middle School
 Eisenhower Elementary School
 Jefferson Elementary School
 Lincoln Elementary School
 Park Elementary School
 Riley Elementary School
 Helping Hands Preschool

See also
 Kansas State Department of Education
 Kansas State High School Activities Association
 List of high schools in Kansas
 List of unified school districts in Kansas

References

External links
 

School districts in Kansas